CEAT Limited (formerly, Cavi Elettrici e Affini Torino) is an Indian multinational tyre manufacturing company owned by the RPG Group. It was established in 1924 in Turin, Italy. It has a presence in global markets. CEAT produces over 165 million tyres a year and manufactures tyres for passenger cars, two-wheelers, trucks and buses, light commercial vehicles, earth-movers, forklifts, tractors, trailers, and auto-rickshaws. The current capacity of CEAT tyres' plants is over 800 tonnes per day.

History 

The company was founded as Cavi Elettrici e Affini Torino (Electrical Cables and Allied Products of Turin) by Virginio Bruni Tedeschi in 1924, in Turin, Italy. On 10 March 1958, the company was incorporated as CEAT Tyres of India, in Mumbai. Initially, the company collaborated with the Tata Group. In 1972, the company set up a research and development unit at Bhandup. In 1981, Deccan Fibre Glass Limited was merged with the company.

In 1980, Alberto, son of Virginio, sold the Cavi Elettrici e Affini Torino to investment firm SOFIT, which went on to cut jobs. Oweing to it, in 1981, the company failed in Italy and Pirelli purchased the right to the CEAT name, which it sold to RPG Group in 1983.

In 1982, RPG Group acquired the company, and in 1990, the company was renamed as CEAT. In 1993, the company collaborated with Yokohama Rubber Company, to manufacture radial tyres at their Nashik unit. In 1999, CEAT formed a joint-venture, named as CEAT Kelani, with Asia MotorWorks (AMW) and Kelani Tyres, to manufacture and market  CEAT tyres in Sri Lanka. in 2006, CEAT Kelani commissioned their first Sri Lanka-based radial-tyre manufacturing unit in Kalutara. In 2009, AMW exited the joint-venture.

Products 
CEAT manufactures tyres for various types of vehicles like heavy commercial vehicles, light commercial vehicle, off-highway tyres, passenger cars, tractors, motorcycles and scooters, cycles and SUVs. It exports Asia.

Sponsorship
CEAT is the bat sponsor of cricketers Rohit Sharma, Shreyas Iyer, Mayank Agarwal, Ajinkya Rahane and Harmanpreet Kaur. From 2015–18, CEAT sponsored the strategic-timeout for the Indian Premier League (IPL).

Anti competition practices 
In April 2022, the Competition Commission of India raided the headquarters of CEAT along with other tyre companies like Apollo Tyres, MRF (Madras Rubber Factory) and Continental Tyres at multiple locations. Earlier in February the antitrust watch dog had released a statement about fining these tyre companies a total of Rs 1788 crores (of which CEAT fined Rs 252.16 cr.) for sharing price sensitive information among themselves to manage their cartelization of tyre prices for supplies to the public transport corporation of Haryana state. Earlier the All India Tyre Dealers Federation had complained to the Ministry of corporate affairs about this cartelization of these companies to increase the tyre prices. The ministry had then referred the case to the CCI.

References 

Tyre manufacturers of India
Manufacturing companies based in Mumbai
Automotive companies of India
RPG Group
Indian brands
Manufacturing companies established in 1924
Italian companies established in 1924
1982 mergers and acquisitions
Multinational companies headquartered in India
Companies listed on the National Stock Exchange of India
Companies listed on the Bombay Stock Exchange